The Cornell Big Red men's ice hockey team is a National Collegiate Athletic Association (NCAA) Division I college ice hockey program that represents Cornell University. Cornell competes in the ECAC Hockey conference and plays its home games at Lynah Rink in Ithaca, New York. Six of the eight Ivy League schools sponsor men's hockey and all six teams play in the 12-team ECAC. The Ivy League crowns a champion based on the results of the games played between its members during the ECAC season.

Cornell has won the ECAC Championship a record 12 times and since the formal creation of the Ivy League athletic conference in 1956 has won the Ivy League title a record 25 times (21 outright, four tied), one more than Harvard's 24 (20 outright, four tied).

The 1970 Cornell Hockey team, coached by Ned Harkness was the first (and currently only team) in NCAA hockey history to win a national title while being undefeated and untied with a perfect 29–0–0 record.

The Big Red's archrival is the Harvard Crimson. The teams meet at least twice each season for installments of the historic Cornell–Harvard hockey rivalry.

History

Background
During Christmas break of 1894–95, Yale University student Malcolm Greene Chace, later known as the "father of hockey in the United States," invited Alexander Meiklejohn, along with a team of men from Yale, Brown, Harvard, and Columbia to tour Canada with the goal of learning the Canadian game of ice hockey, which differed from the game of ice polo normally played by American college students. Upon their return, the students established hockey clubs at their respective schools. Meiklejohn promoted the game at Cornell, where he was a graduate student.

Early years

Cornell's history with ice hockey begins at the dawn of the 20th century, with the first organized game being played in February 1901 at the Philadelphia Ice Palace. The ice hockey squad played a total of three games over a four-day period, winning each contest. That first weekend Cornell employed G. A. Smith as the team's coach but for the next eight years would go without. That was perhaps just as well as Cornell played four games over a three-year period, with each match being held at the St. Nicholas Rink in New York City, and was then mothballed for two years. The newly rechristened Big Red returned in February 1907, playing a two-game set on campus for the first time. With no indoor or even artificial facility available all home games were played on Beebe Lake. This ended up being a rather poor arrangement since the ice hockey team would have to rely on good weather for their games until the second half of the century.

In 1909 Talbot Hunter arrived to be the first full-time head coach for the Big Red and was able to lead the ice hockey team to a perfect 10–0 record in 1910–11 with none of the games played in Ithaca. Talbot would leave after 1912 but after one win in two seasons he returned as joint ice hockey, lacrosse and soccer coach, heading the squads for two years before moving on. 1916 was also the last year for the ice hockey team as it was shut down due to World War I and lack of available facilities. Up to 1916 Cornell had only played 6 games at their 'home' rink and the team wouldn't return to the ice until 1921. When they did their new head coach was former NHA-er Nick Bawlf, who would lead the program until 1947. Cornell would play as much as it was able over the next 27 years, frequently eschewing Beebe Lake when it wasn't cold enough to skate on safely. After 1931 Cornell could manage no more than two home games each season but, despite the inconvenience, the university continued to support the program. Cornell was one of the few teams to continue playing throughout the duration of World War II but after Bawlf died in the summer of 1947 the drive behind keeping the team alive diminished. Cornell would play one more hockey season under Bud Boeringer but after so much difficulty with the weather the program was suspended indefinitely.

Return of the program
In March 1957 Cornell opened its first on-campus arena, the Lynah Rink. The following winter Cornell restarted its ice hockey program with a convincing 16–3 win over the Lehigh club team. While the Big Red wouldn't win many more games over the succeeding three seasons head coach Paul Patten slowly rebuilt the program until it was a respectable squad. Cornell was one of 28 schools who were founding members of ECAC Hockey in 1961 and commemorated the occasion by posting their first winning season since returning. The Big Red finished eighth in the conference but weren't ranked highly enough to receive a bid into the 8-team postseason tournament.

Patten resigned in 1963 and was replaced by former Rensselaer head coach Ned Harkness. That move was a major turning point in the history of the program. Within two seasons Harkness turned the Big Red into a powerhouse, leading them to a 19–7 record, their first of 11 consecutive .700+ records. though they lost their first playoff game to Brown they improved to 22–5 the next year and reached the ECAC championship game. Cornell received the second eastern bid for finishing as the conference runner-up but because of a disagreement between the NCAA and the Ivy League over postseason participation Cornell declined the invitation.

Championship years
In November 1966 the Cornell faithful were able to get their first taste of Ken Dryden, a goaltender who had made waves on the freshman team the year before, and were overjoyed when the Big Red got off to an 11–0 start. A big game was held between the nation's top two teams on December 30 when Cornell met Boston University in the championship game of the Boston Arena Christmas Tournament. The two teams fought to a 3–3 tie through regulation and continued to battle on into the night. After two extra periods neither Dryden nor his counterpart had relinquished another goal and the head coaches for both squads agreed to declare the game a draw with both teams claiming the championship. The following weekend senior David Quarrie was in net for Cornell's first defeat of the season but the 3–4 home loss to Yale lit a fire under the Big Red. Cornell would not lose another game at the Lynah Rink until February 1972, setting a record that stands today of 63 consecutive home wins. The Big Red, led by Dryden, Harry Orr and Doug Ferguson dominated their competition the rest of the year, surrendering only 12 goals in the next 11 games (all victories) finishing the regular season with a 22–1–1 record. The Big Red were not, however, able to claim the ECAC title as Boston University had finished with a 19–0–1 record in conference play. Cornell turned its second-place finish into an 11–2 trouncing of Brown in the quarterfinals followed up by demolishing third-place Boston College 12–2 in the semifinal. The Big Red met BU in the ECAC championship game for their much-awaited rematch but this time no overtime was needed as Cornell took the title 4–3.

Despite the championship win Boston University received the top eastern seed and were able to play 15–14–1 Michigan State while Cornell was forced to take on the best team in the west, North Dakota. Cornell was able to defeat the powerful but low-scoring Fighting Sioux in a nail-biter, winning 1–0 before meeting Boston University for the third time in the championship game. Cornell got off to a quick start, scoring less than two minutes into the game, and never looked back, taking their first national title by a score of 4–1. Aside from it being the first championship for the Big Red, it was the first crown for any eastern squad since head coach Ned Harkness won his championship with Rensselaer in 1954.

Ken Dryden would continue to post gaudy records for the Big Red for the next two seasons, winning both the ECAC regular season and tournament championships both years, but faltered in the NCAA tournament, finishing third and second, respectively. Dryden left the school with an astonishing 76–4–1 career record, setting a host of new NCAA records including for career wins, save percentage (.939) and goals against average (1.59). While most of his records have since been broken, his career winning percentage of  will likely remain untouched.

When Dryden graduated in 1969, leaving Cornell without the best player in program history, the Big Red were expected to take a step back but team captains Dick Bertrand, Dan Lodboa and John Hughes weren't about to let that happen. After an early-season scare against Brown the team ran through the competition, going 24–0 in the regular season, outscoring opponents 156–43. After eviscerating St. Lawrence 8–1 in the quarterfinals Cornell finally got some pushback with a close 6–5 win over Harvard in the semifinals. In the championship game the Big Red faced off against Clarkson for the first time that season with the Golden Knights top goaltender Bruce Bullock being seen as the only thing that could stop the Big Red from continuing their undefeated season. While Bullock did his job the rest of the Clarkson team couldn't and Cornell claimed its fourth consecutive ECAC tournament championship (a record they hold with Boston University).

In the NCAA tournament Cornell faced off against Wisconsin for the first time in team history and were stifled by the Badgers, being held to less than three goals for the first time all season. Wisconsin, however, wasn't able to solve the oppressive Big Red defense and Cornell won the game 2–1. In the championship match Cornell was again set against Clarkson and the Golden Knights got an early jump with a goal 20 seconds into the contest. The Big Red built a 2–1 lead before Clarkson tied the game late in the first period then retook the advantage by the midpoint of the second period. Cornell knotted the score just over four minutes later and sent the game into the third tied at 3-all. In the final frame the offensive onslaught from Cornell finally broke down Clarkson and Lodboa scored a natural hat trick with a goal at even strength, on the power-play and shorthanded. The stellar individual performance allowed Cornell to win the game 6–4, claim their second national title, and post the first (and only, as of 2020) undefeated and untied championship season in NCAA Division I history.

Continuing success
After the undefeated season Ned Harkness left the school to take over the Detroit Red Wings, becoming the first college coach to jump directly into the NHL. His successor was named shortly thereafter as Dick Bertrand. When Bertrand took over he hadn't yet graduated and thus became the first undergraduate to be named as head coach of a program in NCAA history. The Big Red hardly lost a step under their new bench boss, going 22–5 in his first season but Cornell faltered in the conference playoffs and finished in fourth place, missing the NCAA tournament for the first time in five years. The team made up for it the following two seasons by winning back-to-back ECAC crowns and reaching the conference title game both times, winning in 1973. The Big Red reached the championship game in 1972 but this time they were no match for Boston University and each of the 39 shots they fired at silver-medalist Tim Regan was turned aside and they lost the match 0–4. They followed up that disappointment by getting their worst tournament result in program history, finishing fourth in 1973. Cornell would continue to produce stellar results for the remainder of the 1970s, posting .700+ records each season except for 1976 (.638) but the team failed to win another regular season crown in any of those years. In addition they lost every ECAC semifinal game they played and were thus left out of the NCAA tournament.

Slow decline

In 1980 Cornell finished with the worst record since before Ned Harkness arrived, but squeaked into the postseason as the 8th seed. The Big Red went on to a surprise run through the conference tournament, taking the title over Dartmouth and making the NCAA tournament. Despite a strong showing Cornell lost their game against Northern Michigan and once again finished in 4th place. The following season Cornell won the West Region, taking their only ECAC division title, but, more importantly, reached the ECAC title game. Though the NCAA had expanded the tournament to 8 teams for that season and discarded the assumed bids for conference runners-up, Cornell had a strong enough record to warrant a #3 seed and get a rematch against Northern Michigan. The quarterfinal was set as a two-game total-goal series, and when the Wildcats took the first game 7–3 the Big Red were behind the eight ball. Cornell fought back valiantly, winning the second game 4–3 but it wasn't enough to keep them alive in the tournament.

The next season saw Cornell produce a losing record and miss the ECAC playoff for the first time since 1964 soon thereafter Bertrand resigned and turned over head coaching duties to his assistant Lou Reycroft. It took three years before the Big Red returned to the ECAC postseason, doing so the year after 7 teams left to form Hockey East. The year after saw Cornell win 20 games for the first time in seven seasons and win the ECAC title but they were once again bounced in the quarterfinals, losing by 1 goal to Championship-era nemesis Denver. After the team dropped to 9th in the conference the following year and missed the playoffs Reycroft was out and replaced by Brian McCutcheon who had played on the Big Red's 1970 championship team. McCutcheon was able to get Cornell back to a winning record and keep them there for five seasons but could only manage to reach one NCAA tournament and one conference championship game in that time. After that the Big Red declined sharply, tying the team record for most loses in a season (19) in 1993. After two more years of futility McCutcheon was ousted and replaced by another Cornell grad, Mike Schafer.

Return to prominence

The Schafer-era began with a bang as Cornell got its first 20-plus-win season in a decade as well as claiming the 1996 ECAC tournament. He followed that up with a second ECAC championship and got Cornell to win its first NCAA tournament round in 25 years. Cornell went through a short lull for the four years after that initial success but won the ECAC regular season title in 2002, their first in 29 years, and the following year posted their most successful season since 1970 by winning the ECAC regular season championship, the conference tournament and reaching their first frozen four since 1980. During that season David LeNeveu broke the 45-year-old NCAA record for lowest single-season goals against average with a 1.20 mark (since broken) as he helped the Big Red post their first 30-win season.

Cornell would continue to produce good results under Schafer for the next several years, winning both conference titles in 2005 with David McKee breaking Ken Dryden's team record for lowest single-season save percentage (.947). The following year the team finished as ECAC tournament runners-up and though they failed to make it out of the regionals they did play in the longest scoreless tie in NCAA history. While Wisconsin outshot, outskated and out-chanced the Big Red all game long McKee kept the Badgers off the board until 5 second remained in the third overtime period, nearly two full games worth of action. After a down year the following season Cornell would finish in the top three in the ECAC championship for five consecutive seasons, winning the title in 2010 but then went into a four-year slump where their highest finish was 4th place in the conference.

In 2017 the team notched 20 wins for the first time since 2010 and finished as conference runners-up. They followed that season up with an ECAC regular season title and while they made the NCAA tournament both years they flamed out in the first round both times.

In 2019–2020 the team finished 23–2–4 and ranked #1 in the nation in the USCHO.com poll. Cornell had the best record in the ECAC Hockey League play and received the Cleary Cup for the third straight year. The 2020 ECAC and NCAA tournaments were cancelled due to the coronavirus pandemic.

Season-by-season results

Coaches

Awards and honors

Hockey Hall of Fame
Ken Dryden (1983)
Joe Nieuwendyk (2011)

US Hockey Hall of Fame
Ned Harkness (1994)

NCAA

Individual awards

Spencer Penrose Award
Ned Harkness: 1968
Mike Schafer: 2020 (co-winner)

NCAA Division I Ice Hockey Scoring Champion
Doug Ferguson, C: 1966

Tournament Most Outstanding Player
Skip Stanowski, D: 1967
Dan Lodboa, D: 1970

All-Americans
First Team

1965–66: Doug Ferguson, D
1966–67: Ken Dryden, D; Harry Orr, D; Doug Ferguson, F
1967–68: Ken Dryden, D; Bruce Pattison, D; Skip Stanowski, D; Brian Cornell, F
1968–69: Ken Dryden, D; Bruce Pattison, D; Brian Cornell, F; Peter Tufford, F
1969–70: Dan Lodboa, D
1970–71: Kevin Pettit, F
1971–72: Larry Fullan, F
1973–74: George Kuzmicz, D
1977–78: Peter Shier, D; Lance Nethery, F
1978–79: Lance Nethery, F
1981–82: Brian Hayward, G
1982–83: Darren Eliot, G
1985–86: Doug Dadswell, G; Joe Nieuwendyk, F
1986–87: Joe Nieuwendyk, F
1990–91: Dan Ratushny, D
1991–92: Parris Duffus, G
2001–02: Matt Underhill, G; Douglas Murray, D
2002–03: David LeNeveu, G; Douglas Murray, D
2004–05: David McKee, G
2009–10: Ben Scrivens, G; Brendon Nash, D
2017–18: Matthew Galajda, G
2019–20: Morgan Barron, F

Second Team

1989–90: Dan Ratushny, D
2002–03: Stephen Baby, F
2004–05: Charlie Cook, D; Matt Moulson, F
2019–20: Yanni Kaldis, D

ECAC Hockey

Individual awards

ECAC Hockey Player of the Year
Doug Ferguson, D: 1966–67
Ken Dryden, G: 1968–69
Lance Nethery, C: 1977–78
Joe Nieuwendyk, C: 1986–87
David LeNeveu, G: 2002–03
David McKee, G: 2004–05
Morgan Barron, F: 2019-20

ECAC Hockey Rookie of the Year
Doug Ferguson, C: 1964–65
Joe Nieuwendyk, C: 1984–85
Trent Andison, F: 1987–88
Kent Manderville, C: 1989–90
Kyle Knopp, LW: 1995–96
David McKee, G: 2003–04
Riley Nash, C: 2007–08
Brian Ferlin, RW: 2011–12
Matthew Galajda, G: 2017–18

ECAC Hockey Best Defensive Forward
Brad Chartrand, RW: 1995–96
Doug Stienstra, LW: 1999–00
Stephen Baby, RW: 2001–02, 2002–03
Tyler Mugford, LW: 2008–09
Greg Miller, C: 2012–13
Cole Bardreau, F: 2014–15
Jake Weidner, F: 2016–17

Tim Taylor Award
Mike Schafer (5): 2002, 2003, 2005, 2018, 2020

ECAC Hockey Student-Athlete of the Year
Colin Greening: 2009–10
Keir Ross: 2011–12
Andy Iles: 2013–14

ECAC Hockey Outstanding Defenseman
Harry Orr: 1966–67

ECAC Hockey Best Defensive Defenseman
Jeff Burgoyne: 1997–98
Brian McMeekin: 2001–02
Douglas Murray: 2002–03
Justin Krueger: 2009–10
Alec McCrea: 2017–18
Matt Nuttle: 2018–19
Alex Green: 2019–20

Ken Dryden Award
Matt Underhill: 2001–02
David LeNeveu: 2002–03
David McKee: 2004–05
Ben Scrivens: 2009–10
Matthew Galajda: 2017–18

ECAC Hockey Most Outstanding Player in Tournament
Doug Ferguson, C: 1967
Ken Dryden, G: 1968, 1969
Carlo Ugolini, LW: 1973
Darren Eliot, G: 1980
Doug Dadswell, G: 1986
Jason Elliott, G: 1996, 1997
David LeNeveu, G: 2003
Charlie Cook, D: 2005
Ben Scrivens, G: 2010

All-Conference
First Team All-ECAC Hockey

1965–66: Harry Orr, D; Doug Ferguson, F
1966–67: Ken Dryden, G; Harry Orr, D; Doug Ferguson, F
1967–68: Ken Dryden, G; Skip Stanowski, D; Bruce Pattison, D; Peter Tufford, F
1968–69: Ken Dryden, G; Bruce Pattison, D; Brian Cornell, F
1969–70: Brian Cropper, G; Dan Lodboa, D
1971–72: Larry Fullan, F
1972–73: Carlo Ugolini, F
1973–74: George Kuzmicz, D
1977–78: Peter Shier, D; Lance Nethery, F
1978–79: Lance Nethery, F
1981–82: Brian Hayward, G
1982–83: Darren Eliot, G
1985–86: Joe Nieuwendyk, F
1986–87: Joe Nieuwendyk, F
1989–90: Dan Ratushny, D
1990–91: Dan Ratushny, D
1995–96: Steve Wilson, D
1996–97: Steve Wilson, D
1998–99: Jeff Burgoyne, D
2001–02: Matt Underhill, G; Douglas Murray, D
2002–03: David LeNeveu, G; Douglas Murray, D
2004–05: David McKee, G; Matt Moulson, F
2008–09: Riley Nash, F
2009–10: Ben Scrivens, G; Brendon Nash, F
2014–15: Joakim Ryan, D
2017–18: Matthew Galajda, G
2018–19: Morgan Barron, F
2019-20: Yanni Kaldis, D; Morgan Barron, F
2021-22: Sam Malinski, D

Second Team All-ECAC Hockey

1961–62: Laing Kennedy, G
1962–63: Laing Kennedy, G
1964–65: Doug Ferguson, F
1965–66: Mike Doran, F
1966–67: Mike Doran, F
1967–68: Brian Cornell, F
1968–69: Peter Tufford, F
1969–70: John Hughes, F
1970–71: Brian Cropper, G; Brian McCutcheon, F; Kevin Pettit, F
1971–72: Jim Higgs, D
1972–73: Bill Murray, D
1974–75: Dave Peace, F
1976–77: Lance Nethery, F
1978–79: Brock Tredway, F
1984–85: Duanne Moeser, F; Peter Natyshak, F
1985–86: Doug Dadswell, G; Chris Norton, D
1987–88: Chris Norton, D
1991–92: Parris Duffus, G
1997–98: Jason Elliott, G
2001–02: Mark McRae, D; Stephen Baby, F
2002–03: Ryan Vesce, F; Stephen Baby, F
2004–05: Charlie Cook, D
2005–06: Matt Moulson, F
2007–08: Colin Greening, F
2008–09: Ben Scrivens, G; Brendon Nash, D; Colin Greening, F
2009–10: Colin Greening, F
2010–11: Joe Devin, F
2011–12: Andy Iles, G; Nick D'Agostino, D
2013–14: Andy Iles, G; Joakim Ryan, D
2018–19: Yanni Kaldis, D
2021-22: Matt Stienburg, F

Third Team All-ECAC Hockey

2005–06: Ryan O'Byrne, D
2006–07: Byron Bitz, F
2009–10: Riley Nash, D
2010–11: Mike Devin, D
2012–13: Greg Miller, F
2013–14: Brian Ferlin, F
2014–15: Cole Bardreau, F
2015–16: Joakim Ryan, D
2017–18: Yanni Kaldis, D
2018–19: Matthew Galajda, G; Cam Donaldson, F
2019-20: Matthew Galajda, G; Alex Green, D
2021-22: Max Andreev, F

ECAC Hockey All-Rookie Team

1987–88: Corrie D'Alessio, G; Trent Andison, F
1988–89: Dan Ratushny, D
1989–90: Ryan Hughes, F; Kent Manderville, F
1993–94: Steve Wilson, D; Vince Auger, F
1994–95: Ryan Smart, F
1995–96: Kyle Knopp, F
1996–97: Ryan Moynihan, F
1998–99: Denis Ladouceur, F
1999–00: Mark McRae, D; Matt McRae, F
2001–02: David LeNeveu, G
2003–04: David McKee, G
2004–05: Sasha Pokulok, D
2006–07: Brendon Nash, D
2007–08: Mike Devin, D; Riley Nash, F
2008–09: Keir Ross, D
2009–10: Nick D'Agostino, D
2010–11: Andy Iles, G
2011–12: Brian Ferlin, F
2016–17: Yanni Kaldis, D
2017–18: Matthew Galajda, G
2021-22: Hank Kempf, D

Retired numbers

Cornell hockey began the practice of retiring numbers on February 25, 2010. The Big Red retired the numbers of Ken Dryden, who played 1965–69, and Joe Nieuwendyk, who played 1984–87.

Olympians
This is a list of Cornell alumni who have played on an Olympic team.

Cornell Athletic Hall of Fame
The following is a list of people associated with the Cornell men's ice hockey program who were elected into the Cornell Athletic Hall of Fame (induction date in parenthesis).

Stephen Baby (2014)
Nick Bawlf (1980)
Dick Bertrand (1989)
Brian Cornell (1982)
Brian Cropper (1985)
Doug Dadswell (2000)
Mike Doran (1998)
Ken Dryden (1978)
Darren Eliot (1996)
Doug Ferguson (1979)
Larry Fullan (1997)
Ned Harkness (1981)
Brian Hayward (1991)
John Hughes (1981)
Frank Hunter (1979)
Laing Kennedy (1980)
Roy Kerling (1999)
Dan Lodboa (1978)
Brian McCutcheon (1986)
Duane Moeser (2003)
Matt Moulson (2016)
Bill Murray (1988)
Douglas Murray (2013)
Lance Nethery (1984)
Joe Nieuwendyk (1994)
Harry Orr (1984)
Bruce Pattison (1983)
Dan Ratushny (2018)
Bob Rule (1986)
Peter Shier (1990)
Skip Stanowski (2001)
Mike Teeter (2005)
Brock Tredway (1989)
Peter Tufford (1978)
Matt Underhill (2012)
James Vaughan (2007)
Bob Wiggans (1986)
Steve Wilson (2010)

Championships
NCAA champions: 1967, 1970
NCAA runners-up: 1969, 1972
ECAC Champions (12): 1967, 1968, 1969, 1970, 1973, 1980, 1986, 1996, 1997, 2003, 2005, 2010
ECAC regular season champions (11): 1968, 1969, 1970, 1972, 1973*, 2002, 2003, 2005, 2018, 2019*, 2020
Ivy League Champions (25): 1966, 1967, 1968, 1969, 1970, 1971, 1972, 1973, 1977, 1978, 1983*, 1984*, 1985*, 1996, 1997, 2002, 2003, 2004*, 2005, 2012, 2014, 2018, 2019, 2020, 2023
Ned Harkness Cup: 2003, 2005, 2008, 2013

 * indicates shared title

Statistical leaders

Career points leaders

Career goaltending leaders

GP = Games played; Min = Minutes played; W = Wins; L = Losses; T = Ties; GA = Goals against; SO = Shutouts; SV% = Save percentage; GAA = Goals against average

Minimum 30 games

Statistics current through the start of the 2018–19 season.

Current roster
As of September 1, 2022.

Big Red players in the NHL
As of July 1, 2022.

† Tredway played in 1 playoff game in 1982.

See also
Cornell Big Red women's ice hockey
Cornell Big Red
Cornell University

External links
Official Athletics Website

References

 
Ice hockey teams in New York (state)
1900 establishments in New York (state)